Baralzon Lake Ecological Reserve is an ecological reserve in the area surrounding the portion of Baralzon Lake within Manitoba, Canada. It was established in 1989 under the Manitoba Ecological Reserves Act.

See also
 List of ecological reserves in Manitoba
 List of protected areas of Manitoba

References

External links
 Baralzon Lake Ecological Reserve Backgrounder
 iNaturalist: Baralzon Lake Ecological Reserve

Protected areas established in 1989
Ecological reserves of Manitoba